Fragments is an EP by Bournemouth alternative group Rapids!, released in various countries in 2011.

Overview
Fragments is a 2011 EP by Rapids!. It was released on 15 August 2011, and features five tracks.  The album is a follow-up to Rapids!’s self-titled EP released in 2010.

Fragments featured one double A-side single, ‘Comets’ and ‘House Of Sand And Fog’, released on 11 July 2011.

Fragments was mixed by Dave Eringa at Electric Daveyland Studios.

Final track Nameless / / Faceless was remixed by Russell Lissack from UK indie band Bloc Party.  The remix was released as a free download.

Track listing
All songs and music were written by Rapids!.
"Littleblood" – 5:01
"House Of Sand And Fog" – 4:43
"Statuesque" – 4:31
"Comets" – 3:25
"Nameless/Faceless" – 4:51

Personnel
 Rob Murray – guitar
 Tim Richards – bass guitar
 James Davies – drums
 Steve DaCosta – guitar
 Matt Holliday – vocals, keyboard

Release history
EP was released in various countries in 2011.

External links

References

Rapids! albums
2011 EPs